Rasheek Rifaat is an electrical engineer at Jacobs Canada Inc. in Calgary, Alberta. He was named a Fellow of the Institute of Electrical and Electronics Engineers (IEEE) in 2015 for his contributions to protection of industrial power systems.

References

Fellow Members of the IEEE
Living people
Year of birth missing (living people)
Place of birth missing (living people)